Paisley and Renfrewshire South  is a constituency of the House of Commons, located in Renfrewshire, Scotland to the southwest of Glasgow. It elects one Member of Parliament at least once every five years using the first-past-the-post system of voting.

Constituency profile and voting patterns

Constituency profile
Covering the southern portion of the Renfrewshire council area, the east of the constituency includes half of Paisley, as well as the smaller town of Johnstone and the villages of Kilbarchan and Elderslie.

This is contrasted with the rural south and west of the seat, containing the villages of Lochwinnoch, Howwood and several hamlets and farms. The constituency also contains the Gleniffer Braes Country Park to the south and Clyde Muirshiel Regional Park to the west, notable for Castle Semple Loch.

Voting Patterns
This seat had traditionally been considered a heartland for the Labour Party, who had held constituencies containing Paisley and its surrounding towns and villages since 1945.

First used in the 2005 election, this seat was won by Labour politician Douglas Alexander, who had been previously MP for its predecessor constituency of Paisley South since 1997. Alexander was re-elected in the 2010 election with an increased share of the vote and majority.

The aftermath of the Scottish independence referendum 2014 resulted in a substantial increase in support for the SNP. Subsequently, the 2015 election saw the SNP candidate Mhairi Black gain the seat on a 27% swing. Black was re-elected in the 2017 election but only held the seat marginally over Labour. However, in the 2019 election she increased her majority and won over half the vote, making it a safe seat for the SNP.

The seat has also seen support for other parties, with the Conservative Party rising in 2017 and 2019 to around a fifth of the vote share. There is also a Liberal Democrat vote in the seat, with the party achieving 7% at the most recent election. The constituency has also seen several minor parties and independents stand in its history, however individually none of these have won more than 2% of the vote in any election.

Boundaries

This seat was created in 2005 from the bulk of the former Paisley South seat, with minor additions from neighbouring constituencies.
Population areas in this seat include Glenburn, Saucel and Hunterhill, Johnstone and Kilbarchan.

Members of Parliament
The constituency's first MP was Douglas Alexander, who had held the seat since its creation in 2005 and its predecessor Paisley South since 1997. Alexander was the Shadow Foreign Secretary, and has previously held Cabinet posts such as Transport Secretary and Scottish Secretary (2006–07; joint), and International Development Secretary (2007–10).

When SNP candidate Mhairi Black gained the seat in May 2015, she was 20 years and 237 days old, making her the youngest ever Member of Parliament (MP) elected to the House of Commons since at least the Reform Act of 1832, replacing William Wentworth-Fitzwilliam; who was 20 years and 11 months old when elected in 1832. She subsequently held the seat at the snap 2017 general election and 2019 general election.

Elections

Elections in the 2010s

Elections in the 2000s

References
Specific

General

Westminster Parliamentary constituencies in Scotland
Constituencies of the Parliament of the United Kingdom established in 2005
Politics of Paisley, Renfrewshire
Politics of Renfrewshire
Johnstone